The East Zone cricket team is a first-class cricket team that represents eastern India in the Duleep Trophy and Syed Mushtaq Ali Trophy Inter Zonal. It is a composite team of five first-class Indian teams from eastern India competing in the Ranji Trophy: Assam, Bihar, Bengal (West Bengal), Jharkhand, Orissa and Tripura.

East Zone has won the Duleep Trophy twice in the 2011/12 and 2012/13 seasons, as well as the Deodhar Trophy four times in the 1992/93, 1993/94, 1996/97 and 2003/04 seasons.

Current squad

Famous players from East Zone

Pankaj Roy
Sourav Ganguly
Arun Lal
Wriddhiman Saha
Mahendra Singh Dhoni
Deep Dasgupta
Rohan Gavaskar
Devang Gandhi
Debasis Mohanty
Shiv Sunder Das
Santosh R Gupta
Manoj Tiwary
Ashok Dinda

External links
 East Zone at CricketArchive

Indian first-class cricket teams